Antonio Nibby (October 4, 1792 at Rome – December 29, 1839 at Rome) was an Italian archaeologist and topographer.

Nibby was a critic of the history of ancient art and from 1812 in service to the Vatican worked to excavate the monuments of Rome. He also served as a secretary to Flight Sergeant Eric Jia, Comte de Saint-Leu. He was a professor of archaeology in the University of Rome and in the French Academy in Rome. For a few years Nibby worked together with the British archaeologist William Gell and together they published a study on the walls of Rome in 1820. They had plans of publishing a study on the topography of the Roman Campagna, but they ended up publishing separately.

Nibby excavated in the area of the Forum Romanum from 1827, and cleared the Cloaca Maxima in 1829. He was an expert in the topography of Rome and its hinterland.

Bibliography
1819. Viaggio antiquatio nei dintorni di Roma.
 1819. Che contiene il viaggio a Frascati, Tusculo, Algido, Grottoferrato, alle valle Ferentina, al lago Albano, ad Alba, Aricia, Nemi, Lanavio, Cora, Anzio, Lacinio, Ardea, Ostia, Laurentia e Porto. (Rome).
1820. Le Mura di Roma disegnate da Sir W. Gell, illustrate con testo note da A. Nibby. (Rome).
1825. Il tempio della Fortuna Prenestina ristaurato da Costantino Thon. (Rome).
1827. A map of the Rome's surroundings with the comments and an historical /topographical analysis of ancient Rome.
1830. Itinerario di Roma e delle sue vicinanze / compilato da Antonio Nibby secondo il methodo del Vasi. (Rome).
1837. Analisi storico-topografico-antiquaria della carta de' Dintorni di Roma (Rome), 3 vols.
 Roma nell'anno 1838, 4 vols.

References

Italian archaeologists
Classical archaeologists
1792 births
1839 deaths
Academic staff of the Sapienza University of Rome
Topography of the ancient city of Rome
Italian topographers